Johann Baptist von Lampi the Elder (31 December 1751 – 11 February 1830) was an Austrian-Italian historical and portrait painter. He settled in the Russian Empire after the third and final partition of Poland, enticed by an extremely generous offer from the Tsar.

Life
Johann Baptist Lampi was born at Romeno in the County of Tyrol to Matteo, or Matthias, Lampi (1698-1780), a decorative painter. Frescoes by his father may be found in many elegant buildings there. He studied art under his father in Verona and later in Salzburg.

In 1773 he went to Trento, where he learned to become a portraitist in canvases and miniatures. He travelled to Innsbruck, then to Vienna, where the Emperor Joseph II appointed him a professor at the Vienna Academy in 1786. That same year, he was invited to Warsaw by the court of King Stanisław II Augustus (pictured). He worked in Warsaw until the complete military Partitions of Poland.

In 1791, he moved to St. Petersburg where the Empress gave him a hereditary knighthood. In Russia he devoted himself to portrait painting, and amassed a large fortune. He painted the Empress Catherine II and Empress Maria Feodorovna (Sophie Dorothea of Württemberg) among others. He returned to Vienna in 1797 and became its honorary citizen in 1799. Pensioned in 1822, he died at Vienna on February 11, 1830.

Both of his sons were also accomplished painters. The older one, Johann Baptist the Younger stayed first with him and later by himself in Russia for 13 years. His younger son, Francesco, or Franz Xaver (born in Klagenfurt in 1783) settled at Warsaw in Congress Poland for the rest of his life, estranged from his father. He became known as Franciszek Ksawery Lampi in Polish. He painted portraits and landscapes, exhibited at Warsaw Salons, and opened an art school there in 1841. In 1823 he travelled to Vienna, Lublin, and in 1830 to Vilna. After the November Uprising against the Russians, he spent a few years in Wrocław. In 1840 he visited Dresden, Berlin and Munich. He returned to Warsaw where he died in 1852.

Selected portraits

References

Further reading

External links

1751 births
1830 deaths
18th-century Austrian painters
18th-century Austrian male artists
Austrian male painters
19th-century Austrian painters
19th-century Austrian male artists
18th-century Italian painters
Italian male painters
19th-century Italian painters
Italian nobility
Austrian nobility
Austrian people of Italian descent
People from Trentino
Italian expatriates in Poland
Edlers of Austria
19th-century Italian male artists
18th-century Italian male artists